Aghavrin Mass Rock is located in Aghavrin townland,  north-west of Coachford village.

Following the religious strife of the seventeenth century and the passing of penal laws in 1695, celebrating Catholic mass in Ireland became a dangerous practice for priest and congregation. Isolated and secluded sites were selected for worship, and natural rocks and boulders often came to be used as an altar or Mass rock. It is often through local knowledge that their locations are still identifiable. The practice of celebrating mass in such fashion was in decline by the middle of the eighteenth century, when many Catholics worshipped in thatched 'mass-houses'.

According to Hartnett (1939) it was a 'sort of ledge or stone altar', located at the foot of Carrigacnubber rock, where Mass was said to have been celebrated in Penal times. In close proximity is an ornamental tower known as Crooke's Castle.

The site is located on private property with no direct access.

See also
Aghavrin (townland)
Aghavrin House
Aghavrin Cottage
Aghavrin Clapper Bridge
Crooke's Castle, Aghavrin
St Olan's, Aghavrin
Mullinhassig Wood & Waterfalls, Aghavrin

References

External links
 acrheritage.info

Mass rocks
Religious buildings and structures in County Cork